James H. Price may refer to:

James Hervey Price (1797–1882), Canadian attorney and political figure
James Hubert Price (1878–1943), American politician and governor
James H. Price (academic) (fl. 1990s–2000s), American academic
J. H. Price (c. 1862–1947), justice of the Mississippi Supreme Court